Russula acrifolia is a species of mushroom. Its cap is coloured grey to blackish-grey; the cap becomes red when it is injured, but then turns blackish-gray. It is edible and described as having an acrid taste. It grows on rich soils.

Distribution
Russula acrifolia is a holarctic species that needs a temperate climate. The species is spread in the Caucasus, Siberia, Korea and Japan, Northern America, Northern Africa and Europe.

Ecological properties
Russula acrifolia is a mycorrhizal mushroom for different trees. Its favourite symbionic partners are Fagus sylvatica and spruce. If those are not available, it can also form symbiotic partnerships with larix, pines, betula, oaks and tilia.

See also
List of Russula species

References

acrifolia
Fungi described in 1962
Fungi of Europe